The Cambridge History of Moral Philosophy is a 2017 book edited by Sacha Golob and Jens Timmermann in which the authors provide an account of the history of moral philosophy in the Western tradition.

Reception
The book was reviewed by T. H. Irwin and Jonathan Head (from Keele University). Irwin calls it a "valuable companion", but he mentions some flaws and shortcomings and points out that it deserves a second enlarged edition.

Essays

References

External links 
 The Cambridge History of Moral Philosophy

2017 non-fiction books
Ethics books
Cambridge University Press books
History books about philosophy
Edited volumes
Works about the history of philosophy